Noble is an unincorporated community in Washington County, Iowa, United States.

History
Edward Case Noble owned a farm here, and when the Burlington and Western Railway was built, a station was established and a grain mill constructed.

Noble's population was 53 in 1902, and 78 in 1925.

Notable people
Edward C. Eicher, United States District Court judge and Congressman, was born in Noble.

Notes

Unincorporated communities in Washington County, Iowa
Unincorporated communities in Iowa